Year 167 (CLXVII) was a common year starting on Wednesday (link will display the full calendar) of the Julian calendar. At the time, it was known as the Year of the Consulship of Aurelius and Quadratus (or, less frequently, year 920 Ab urbe condita). The denomination 167 for this year has been used since the early medieval period, when the Anno Domini calendar era became the prevalent method in Europe for naming years.

Events

By place

Roman Empire 
 Lucius Aurelius Verus Augustus and Marcus Ummidius Quadratus Annianus become Roman Consuls. 
 The Marcomanni tribe wages war against the Romans at Aquileia. They destroy aqueducts and irrigation conduits. Marcus Aurelius repels the invaders, ending the Pax Romana (Roman Peace) that has kept the Roman Empire free of conflict since the days of Emperor Augustus.
 The Vandals (Astingi and Lacringi) and the Sarmatian Iazyges invade Dacia. To counter them, Legio V Macedonica, returning from the Parthian War, moves its headquarters from Troesmis in Moesia Inferior to Potaissa in Dacia Porolissensis.
 The Germans devastate the Balkans and ransack the sanctuary of Eleusis, near Athens.

Asia 
 Change of era name from Yanxi to Yongkang of the Chinese Han Dynasty.
 King Chogo of Baekje wages war against Silla in the Korean peninsula.
</onlyinclude>

Births 
 Zhang Yi (or Junsi), Chinese official (d. 230)

Deaths 
 Abercius, bishop of Hieropolis (approximate date)
 Anicetus, pope of Rome (approximate date)
 Wang Fu, Chinese philosopher (b. AD 82)

References 

 

als:160er#167